Kalateh-ye Arab (also Romanized as Kalāteh-ye ‘Arab and Kalāteh ‘Arab) is a village in Zarrin Rural District, Atamalek District, Jowayin County, Razavi Khorasan Province, Iran. At the 2006 census, its population was 1,196, in 355 families.

References 

Populated places in Joveyn County